Calycophysum is a genus of the gourd family.

Species

References

External links

 

Cucurbitaceae genera
Cucurbitoideae